Browns Crossroad is an unincorporated community in Henry County, Alabama, United States.

History
Browns Crossroad is named after Thomas Brown, an early setter of the area.

References

Unincorporated communities in Henry County, Alabama
Unincorporated communities in Alabama